Luis Alberto Rosales Ortíz (born 13 October 1998) is a Mexican footballer who plays as a midfielder for Potros UAEM.

References

1998 births
Living people
Association football midfielders
Potros UAEM footballers
Ascenso MX players
Tercera División de México players
Footballers from the State of Mexico
People from Toluca
Mexican footballers